Janina Miller San Miguel (born November 14, 1990) is a Filipino beauty queen who was crowned Binibining Pilipinas World at the Binibining Pilipinas 2008 beauty pageant.

San Miguel resigned from her title in September 2008, citing personal reasons including the death of her grandfather. The title was transferred to 1st Runner-up, Danielle Castaño, who went on to represent the country at the Miss World 2008 pageant.

Background
Janina San Miguel came from a poor family living in a residential compound in Quezon City, Metro Manila. She is the eldest of three children, with her father working as a jeepney driver and her mother as a laundry washer or "labandera" (hired to wash other people's clothes).

At the time of the Binibining Pilipinas 2008 pageant, San Miguel was a freshman student taking up broadcast communication at the University of the East in Manila, with the ambition of becoming a professional broadcaster. She had previously garnered first runner-up at her school's Mister and Miss UE pageant, and said she joined the Binibining Pilipinas competition to gain "experiences, new friends and opportunities".

Binibining Pilipinas

The 2008 Binibining Pilipinas pageant was held on March 8, 2008 at the Araneta Coliseum in Quezon City, Metro Manila. At seventeen years old, Janina San Miguel was the youngest contestant of the twenty-four women in the competition, as well as one of the tallest at 5 ft 11 in (180 cm). Early in the competition, San Miguel had won special awards for Best in Swimsuit and Best in Long Gown.

Question and answer
As part of the question and answer portion of the pageant, candidates were made to randomly select the name of their questioner-judge out of a fishbowl. The name that San Miguel picked was that of Vivienne Tan, who asked "What role did your family play for you as candidate to Binibining Pilipinas?"

San Miguel responded:

As San Miguel lost her composure in giving her answer, the audience reacted with jeers and applause, as well as laughter from the panel of judges and other contestants. Midway through her answer, pageant host Paolo Bediones encouraged her off-microphone to continue in Tagalog, though she proceeded with her response in English.

Despite the problems with her answer, she went on to win the competition and was crowned Binibining Pilipinas World. The criteria for judging the winner of the pageant allotted 80 percent to physical beauty, leaving just 20 percent to be divided evenly between personality and intelligence. Bediones later defended San Miguel, saying "I admire her for not buckling under the pressure and for being as blatantly honest as possible". However, he also added, "No matter how badly she may have performed in the Q&A, she couldn't have lost much considering she had a huge headstart in the scores". Winning the title made her the official designated Philippine delegate to the Miss World 2008 pageant, which was scheduled to be held later that year in Kyiv, Ukraine (the venue was later moved to Johannesburg, South Africa due to the conflict between Georgia and Russia).

San Miguel has admitted to being offended by criticism of her response. In an interview with entertainment commentator Ricky Lo a week after the event, she explained that she did not comprehend the question clearly when she was on stage at the pageant, due to the softness of the questioner's voice. When given another opportunity to answer the same question, she smiled and said, "My family is my inspiration".

Reaction
Video clips of her response have been uploaded to YouTube and garnered over 3 million views. Rep. Eduardo Gullas, a senior lawmaker in the Philippine House of Representatives who authored a bill to reinstate English as the medium of instruction in schools, said the video of the incident was "tormenting to watch", and added, "She is a Filipino, and English is our highly favored second language. So people expected more from her." Following the incident, the director of the Technical Education and Skills Development Authority offered to coordinate with pageant organizers to conduct English courses for all Miss Philippines candidates to better express themselves.

San Miguel's response has drawn comparisons between her and Melanie Marquez, Filipina winner of the 1979 Miss International pageant who is well-known for her shortcomings in speaking English.

Resignation
It was announced on September 30, 2008 that Janina San Miguel had resigned her position of Binibining Pilipinas World. A short official statement released by Binibining Pilipinas Charities said "The untimely demise of her grandfather, among other personal reasons, has caused her undue stress, thus hindering her from fulfilling her duties for the said title". Her resignation came  months after winning the title, and just  months before the scheduled Miss World pageant.

The announcement of her resignation was met with speculation that San Miguel had been forced by Binibining Pilipinas pageant organizers to relinquish her title due to a lack of professionalism during preparatory training sessions, which strained the patience of her mentors and superiors. In a later interview, she admitted that due to multiple conflicts in schedule she was unable to attend all the training sessions arranged for her by pageant organizers, which included sessions to improve her speaking ability. She also admitted to throwing a fit in the middle of a rehearsal when she received news that her grandfather was dying, and demanded that she be allowed to leave. However, according to an interview in a Singapore-based documentary series, San Miguel bared that the indecent sexual propositions, social isolation, and the contest organizers’ rigid standards were the reasons she gave up her Binibining Pilipinas crown and her chance to represent the Philippines in the Miss World contest in 2008.

In accordance with pageant rules, San Miguel's title was automatically transferred to the first runner up, Danielle Castaño. Castaño represented the Philippines at the Miss World 2008 pageant held in Johannesburg, South Africa in December 2008, where she placed as a finalist in the Miss World Beach Beauty fast track event and a semi-finalist in the Miss World Top Model fast track event.

Entertainment career
San Miguel was strongly considered for a role as a contestant in the second season of the reality television series Survivor Philippines, which began filming in May 2009. Though one of the show's criteria is that the contestants must not be celebrities, San Miguel was not regarded to be a celebrity by the show's producers. Show host Paolo Bediones (who incidentally also hosted the Binibining Pilipinas pageant) explained in an interview that she was a shoo-in for the part, but decided to back out at the last minute.

In August 2009, San Miguel became a contestant in the third season of Celebrity Duets: Philippine Edition. In the season's first three episodes, she performed duets with Maureen Larrazabal, Bituin Escalante, and Paolo Ballesteros. However, she garnered the lowest number of text votes in the first round of eliminations, and became the first contestant voted off of the show on September 12, 2009.

San Miguel has stated that she is refraining from focusing full time on her entertainment career due to her ongoing studies, though she continues to work on her figure in preparation for modeling opportunities. On October 23, 2009, she was one of the ten finalists in the Philippine qualifying round of the Ford Models Supermodel of the World modeling contest, which was held at the SMX Convention Center in Pasay. She advanced to the top three, but the contest was won by Charlene Almarvez, who went on to win first-runner up to Karlina Caune of the Baltics in the Supermodel of the World finals held in São Paulo, Brazil.

References

External links
Binibining Pilipinas official website
YouTube - Janina San Miguel - Bb. Pilipinas 2008 Q&A (complete)

University of the East alumni
1990 births
Living people
People from Quezon City
Filipino female models
Binibining Pilipinas winners
Viral videos
Beauty pageant controversies
Filipino people of American descent
Filipino people of Indian descent
Participants in Philippine reality television series